This is a list of cantonal legislatures of Switzerland. Each canton has a democratically elected cantonal legislature, as well as elected members to the Federal Assembly. The cantonal legislatures are elected for four years, except in Fribourg, Vaud, Geneva and Jura, which elect their legislatures for five years.

The largest legislature, in Zürich, has 180 members, whilst the smallest, in less-populous Appenzell Innerrhoden, has onlyGR 49 members. Appenzell Innerrhoden is also the only legislature that is non-partisan. All other legislatures operate party political systems. The Swiss People's Party (SVP/UDC) and FDP.The Liberals are the largest party in eight legislatures each, whilst the Christian Democratic People's Party (CVP/PDC) is the largest in six and the Social Democratic Party (SP/PS) is the largest in three.

Two cantons, Appenzell Innerrhoden and Glarus, hold  as their highest legislative body. Under this system, a form of direct democracy, all adult citizens may attend an annual general assembly, where they may vote on laws. For the purpose of this article, the permanent legislature is considered the cantonal legislature.

Terminology 
The legislatures of the cantons have various names  in different cantons and in the four official languages of Switzerland:

 Great Council (German: Grosser Rat, French: Grand Conseil, Italian: Gran Consiglio, Romansh: Cussegl grond ) is called in the cantons of Aargau , Appenzell Innerrhoden , Basel-Stadt , Bern , Fribourg , Geneva , Graubünden , Neuchâtel , Ticino , Thurgau , Vaud and Valais . In German-speaking Switzerland, the members of the Grand Council are called Grand Councilor ( Grosssrätin ), with the exception of Thurgau where they are called Cantonal Councilor (Kantonsrätin). In French-speaking Switzerland, the title is Député (Member of Parliament).

 Cantonal Council (German: Kantonsrat) in the cantons of Appenzell Ausserrhoden , Lucerne , Obwalden , Schaffhausen , Schwyz , Solothurn , St. Gallen , Zug and Zurich . The term came up in the 19th century; the older names were Great Council (renaming in Solothurn 1840, in Zurich 1869, in Zug 1873, in Appenzell Ausserrhoden 1876, in Schaffhausen 2002, in St. Gallen 2003, in Lucerne 2008) and District Administrator (renaming in Schwyz 1833, in Obwalden 1867 ). ). 
 State Council (German: Landrat) in the cantons of Basel-Landschaft , Glarus , Nidwalden and Uri .
 Parliament (French: Parlement ) in the canton of  Jura (since the canton was founded).

List

See also
 List of cantonal executives of Switzerland

Notes

 
Legislatures